The St. Peter the Apostle Church, also known as the Parroquia de San Pedro Apostol, is a Roman Catholic church located in the municipality of Vinzons in Camarines Norte, Philippines. It is the oldest church in Camarines Norte built by the Franciscan friars in 1611. The current parish priest is Rev. Fr. Augusto Jesus B. Angeles III, appointed in 2013.

History
A town named Tacboan was established by Franciscan priests in 1581. In 1611, Fr. Juan de Losar, OFM built a church named after Saint Peter. Fr. Losar was the first parish priest of the church. In 1624, the whole town of Tacboan was relocated and it was called Indan where a new church was built with the same patron saint, St. Peter the Apostle. In 1636, the missionaries established a church of Labo combining with Indan. In 1661, the secular clergy started administering the church.

After World War II, Indan was renamed Vinzons in honor of Wenceslao Q. Vinzons; a former governor of the Camarines Norte, youngest delegate to the Philippine Constitutional Convention of 1935, and a guerrilla leader martyred by the Japanese during World War II.

In 1994, the left and right sides of the church were repaired with the help of the townspeople. In 2011, the 400th foundation anniversary of the Parish of St. Peter the Apostle including the Parish of St. John the Baptist in Daet and Paracale Church|Parish of Nuestra Señora de Candelaria in Paracale was celebrated.

On December 26, 2012, the church was destroyed by a fire.   According to its parish priest, Fr. Francisco Regala Jr., the historical artifacts of church were not saved.  The Governor of Camarines Norte, Edgardo Tallado, said that the slow response of the fire marshall resulted in the destruction of the whole church except for the concrete walls.

Reconstruction
Through the efforts of Fr. Augusto Jesus B. Angeles III, the 400-year-old limestone church was restored in a 15th-century setting. The flooring consists of the same  or machuca tiles, specially fired and featuring the same design. Wooden doors and benches are made of yakal, featuring sculpted banyan tree leaves. The windows are handcrafted and fired by Kraut Art Glass with a modern and symmetrical design. Chandeliers and ceiling murals were commissioned pro bono by Hermes Alegre, a visual artist from the Philippines. These works were made possible by the donations of a few families in Vinzons, such as the altar with Italian granite flooring. The church's pulpit was also restored using the wooden materials which survived the fire that gutted it.

The church was inaugurated on June 29, 2015, on the feast of its patron saint, St. Peter the Apostle.

Features
The facade is plain and traditional, with a triangular pediment and a flat wall. There are no horizontal bands to separate the facade into storeys, though a steam of cornices separate the pediment from the wall. An arched main portal contrasts against the otherwise plain facade, its smoothness stark against the unplastered masonwork of the rest of the facade. The spacious central niche holds the town patron, surrounded by a florid frame. A square bell tower rises to the church's left. It tapers slightly and a peculiar layering indicates different types of masonry used in its construction. Its campanile windows are protected with decorative balustrades and a squat spire is topped with a cross.

List of parish priests

List of Parochial Vicars
 Rev. Fr. Quirino G. Parcero (1962 - 1965)
 Rev. Fr. Efren S. Sanchez (July 1976 to April 1978)
 Rev. Fr. Ruben Cammayo (1980s)
 Rev. Fr. Andrei F. Uy (1996 - 1998)
 Rev. Fr. Rodrigo A. Lazarte (1998 - 2000s)
 Rev. Fr. Gerardo P. Nemi (2003 - 2008)
 Rev. Fr. Venancio Rosales (2005 - 2006)
 Rev. Fr. Luis M. Puno, Jr. (2008 - 2010)
 Rev. Fr. Ace D. Baracena (2013 - 2014)
 Rev. Fr. Rainier M. Abaño (2014 - 2015)
 Rev. Fr. Donn Corre (2015 - 2019)
 Rev. Fr. Peter Molina (2019 - ??)
 Rev. Fr. Michael T. Rañeses (?? - Present)

Schedule of services

Sacraments

Masses
 Monday to Friday: 6:00 am
 Friday: 5:30 pm
 Saturday: 6:00 am; 6:00 pm (Anticipated Mass)
 Sunday: 5:30 am, 6:30 am, 7:30 am, 4:00 pm, 6:00 pm, 7:00 pm

Baptism
 Saturday & Sunday: 10:30 am

Wedding
By appointment at the Parish Office

Devotions
 Morning Prayer & Rosary: Monday to Saturday before the 6:00am Mass
 First Saturday Procession: 4:30am before the 6:00am Mass

References

Roman Catholic churches in Camarines Norte
1611 establishments in the Philippines
Roman Catholic churches completed in 1611
17th-century Roman Catholic church buildings in the Philippines
Churches in the Roman Catholic Diocese of Daet